Jinhan was a loose confederacy of chiefdoms that existed from around the 1st century BC  to the 4th century AD in the southern Korean Peninsula, to the east of the Nakdong River valley, Gyeongsang Province. Jinhan was one of the Samhan (or "Three Hans"), along with Byeonhan and Mahan. Apparently descending from the Jin state of southern Korea, Jinhan was absorbed by the later Silla, one of the Three Kingdoms of Korea.

History

Jinhan, like the other Samhan confederacies, arose out of the confusion and migration following the fall of Wiman Joseon in 108 BC. Some Chinese records state that refugees from the Lelang area sought asylum within the state of Jin (now Jinhan) after political turmoil of the Qin dynasty.

Book of Wei - Volume 30's some part are record left by Wei envoy who visited Okjeo and Jinhan after the victory of the Goguryeo–Wei War and the Battle of Giryeong at the late 3rd century.

Thus, Jinhan's 12 countries are records of quasi-independent countries that have weakened since the defeat of Silla during the Cheomhae Isageum era.

Before the 3rd century, it was presumed that there was no distinction between the Jinhan (辰韓) and Byeonhan (弁韓 or 弁辰).

It is said that the people of Jinhan and Byeonhan intermingled and immigrated quite frequently (雜居), ultimately making it difficult to differentiate the two states culturally.

Culture
Its relation to the earlier state of Jin is not clear, although the contemporary Chinese chronicle San Guo Zhi alleges that Jinhan was identical with Jin (while another record describes Jin as the predecessor of the Samhan as a whole). Jinhan and Byeonhan shared essentially the same culture, with varying religious customs, and apparently were not separated by a clear boundary.

Many of the archeological evidence found in the area lack distinguishable differences with the evidence found in the neighboring kingdoms, suggesting that the cultures were mostly similar across the southern part of the peninsula.

Little is known about the daily lives of the Jinhan people. The religion appears to have been shamanistic which played an important role in politics as well.  Agriculture was heavily dominated by rice, but also included substantial rearing of livestock including horses, cattle, and chickens.

Similar to Byeonhan, infants born in Jinhan were made flat headed by pushing their skulls onto a flat rock. This practice is thought to have lasted up to the Gaya confederacy.

Language 
The language of Jinhan is thought to be the predecessor of the language of Silla, which in turn was the supposed ancestor of the modern Korean language.

However, due to multiple evidence stating that Silla, Baekje and Goguryeo spoke similar languages without a need of a translator, it can be deduced that the languages spoken in Jinhan bore close resemblance to languages spoken in countries such as Byeonhan and Mahan at the time.

Statelets
According to the San Guo Zhi, Jinhan consisted of 12 statelets of 600 to 5000 families each divided from 6 statelets:

 Saro (사로국, 斯盧國), most powerful state in Jinhan, it is also called Seorabeol. In 503, Saro state renamed itself "Silla".
 Gijeo (기저국, 己柢國), present-day Andong.
 Bulsa (불사국, 不斯國), present-day Changnyeong.
 Geun-gi (근기국, 勤耆國), present-day Pohang or Cheongdo.
 Nanmirimidong (난미리미동국, 難彌理彌凍國), present-day Miryang. It is also called "Mirimidong".
 Yeomhae (염해국, 冉奚國), present-day Ulsan.
 Gunmi (군미국, 軍彌國), present-day Sacheon.
 Yeodam (여담국, 如湛國), present-day Gunwi.
 Horo (호로국, 戶路國), present-day Sangju.
 Juseon (주선국, 州鮮國), present-day Gyeongsan.
 Mayeon (마연국, 馬延國), present-day Miryang.
 U-yu (우유국, 優由國), present-day Cheongdo or Yeongdeok.

According to Samguk Sagi, the Silla Kingdom (around present-day Gyeongju), was founded by Bak Hyeokgeose in 57 BC, who united the six clans of Jinhan under his rule. The records are sparse and conflicting regarding the relationship of the names Jinhan, Saro, Seorabeol, and the later Silla kingdom.

Location
Most theories indicate that Jinhan was located in the area later occupied by the Silla kingdom: the Gyeongju Basin and adjacent Sea of Japan coast.  It would have been neighbored by the Byeonhan confederacy on the southwest, and by the much larger Mahan confederacy on the west.  On the north it would have been bounded by the Chinese commanderies and the small coastal state of Dongye.  However, some scholars place Jinhan in the Han River valley, bounded by Mahan on the north and Byeonhan on the south.

References

Ancient peoples
Early Korean history
Former countries in Korean history
Silla
1st-century BC establishments
4th-century disestablishments
Former confederations